Padeswood & Buckley railway station was a station in Padeswood, Flintshire, Wales. The station was opened around October 1850 and closed on 6 January 1958. Only the stationmaster's house remains as a private residence.

References

Further reading

Disused railway stations in Flintshire
Railway stations in Great Britain opened in 1850
Railway stations in Great Britain closed in 1958
Former London and North Western Railway stations